Stéphanie Yon-Courtin (born 28 March 1974) is a French lawyer and politician of La République En Marche! (LREM) who has been serving as a Member of the European Parliament since 2019.

Early career
In the late 1990s, Yon-Courtin spent nearly two years working at the European Commission. before moving to law firms Freshfields Bruckhaus Deringer and Allen & Overy. She later worked as advisor to France's Competition Authority from 2007 until 2010.

Political career
Ahead of the 2017 French legislative election, Yon-Courtin ran for the Republicans' nomination in Calvados.

Since entering the European Parliament, Yon-Courtin has been serving on the Committee on Economic and Monetary Affairs. In this capacity, she is the parliament's rapporteur on competition law and the 2021 Digital Markets Act.

In addition to her committee assignments, Yon-Courtin chairs the Parliament's delegation for relations with Canada. She is also a member of the European Parliament Intergroup on Artificial Intelligence and Digital, the European Parliament Intergroup on Children’s Rights, the European Parliament Intergroup on Climate Change, Biodiversity and Sustainable Development, the European Parliament Intergroup on Seas, Rivers, Islands and Coastal Areas and the MEPs Against Cancer group.

Political positions
In a 2022 letter to European Commissioner for the Environment, Oceans and Fisheries Virginijus Sinkevičius, Yon-Courtin – together with Pierre Karleskind and Nathalie Loiseau – urged the EU to take measures to end British water treatment facilities’ discharges of raw sewage into shared waters, part of what they argued was an unacceptable lowering of environmental standards since Brexit.

References

1974 births
Living people
People from Coutances
Mayors of places in Normandy
University of Caen Normandy alumni
Alumni of the University of Bristol
MEPs for France 2019–2024
21st-century women MEPs for France
21st-century French women lawyers
21st-century French lawyers
La République En Marche! MEPs